Sheila Sim (born 7 June 1984) is a Singaporean actress and model.

Early life and education
Sim was educated at Radin Mas Primary School and CHIJ Saint Theresa's Convent. She later studied at Nanyang Polytechnic but dropped out after three months. Sim graduated from Marketing Institute of Singapore with a Diploma in Sales and Marketing and Curtin Singapore with a Degree in Advertising and Marketing respectively. In 2021, Sim graduated from with a Diploma in Positive Psychology from the School of Positive Psychology.

Career 
Sim started modelling in 2001. She was discovered at 16 by a talent scout while attending the wedding of her aunt Ivy Chng, who was a runway model in the 1980s. In 2009, Sim made her film debut in indie film Autumn In March, and later in 2013, she made her television debut in Channel 8's Chinese drama series, I'm in Charge. 

In September 2013, Sim started a modelling agency, NU Models, with Olinda Cho.

In 2014, Sim filmed a toggle original series, Mystic Whisper and a long-running half hour drama, 118 that earned her first nominatation for Best Supporting Actress and Top 10 Most Popular Female Artistes in Star Awards 2016. In 2016, she made cameo appearances in The Queen and You Can Be an Angel 2. She also filmed The Dream Job, Hero and 118 II, which earned her second acting nomination for Best Supporting Actress in Star Awards 2018. She participated in dramas 118 Reunion, Eat Already? 4 and Reach For The Skies, and toggle original series, VIC and  a Singapore-Hong Kong collaboration drama, Blue Tick.

Sim won her first Top 10 Most Popular Female Artistes award in 2018 on her third nomination.

Personal life
In January 2018, Sim announced that she married a banker named Deon Woo. They have two daughters: Layla Woo, born on 22 September 2020,  and Skyla Woo, born on 7 February 2023.

Filmography

Television

Film

Awards and nominations

References

External links
 
 

Living people
Singaporean people of Chinese descent
Singaporean people of Hokkien descent
Singaporean film actresses
Singaporean television actresses
Singaporean television personalities
21st-century Singaporean actresses
1984 births